Ndavi Nokeri (born 25 January 1999) is a South African model and beauty pageant titleholder who was crowned Miss South Africa 2022, she represented South Africa at the Miss Universe 2022 and placed in the Top 16. She will now represent South Africa at Miss World 2023.

Early life

Nokeri was born in Tzaneen, located in Limpopo Province, South Africa. She comes from a devout Christian family. Both of her parents are pastors. She is the family's youngest child by quite a few years. She is fluent in Xitsonga and Sepedi in addition to English and Afrikaans.

She entered Miss South Africa 2022 and won on her first attempt. She will be representing South Africa at Miss Universe 2022 and Miss World 2023.

References

External links

1999 births
Living people
Miss South Africa winners
Miss Universe 2022 contestants
Miss World 2022 delegates
University of Pretoria alumni
People from Limpopo